Timothy Martyn Rees (born 4 September 1974) is a former English cricketer.  Rees is a right-handed batsman who bowls right-arm off break.

Rees made his debut in county cricket for the Lancashire Cricket Board against Shropshire in the 2002 MCCA Knockout Trophy.  In that same season he made a single first-class appearance for Lancashire against Somerset at the County Ground, Taunton, in the County Championship.  He batted once in the match, scoring 16 runs in Lancashire's first-innings, before he was dismissed by Matthew Bulbeck.  It was in that same season that he also made his List A debut against Middlesex at the Denis Compton Oval in the 2002 Norwich Union National League.  He made a second List A appearance the following season against India A at Stanley Park, Blackpool.  He thereafter appeared for the Lancashire Second XI, with Rees agreeing a new contract during the 2004 season.  However, with opportunities limited at Lancashire, he left the county during the 2005 season.

References

External links
Tim Rees at ESPNcricinfo
Tim Rees at CricketArchive

1984 births
Living people
Sportspeople from Loughborough
Cricketers from Leicestershire
English cricketers
Lancashire Cricket Board cricketers
Lancashire cricketers